Carnival Cravings (also known as Carnival Cravings with Anthony Anderson) is an American television series on Food Network about  unique food found at American carnivals. The series features actor/host Anthony Anderson as he samples culinary creations only available at carnivals, fairs and festivals around the country. The show premiered on August 12, 2015 and airs on Wednesdays at 10:00 p.m. EDT.

Premise
Opening Introduction: (narrated by Anthony Anderson)

Episodes

References

External links
 Official website 
 

Food Network original programming
2015 American television series debuts